Dashon Johnson (born January 25, 1988) is an American professional boxer, mixed martial artist, and former North American Boxing Association (NABA) title super middleweight champion.

Johnson is from Fontana, California.

Boxing career

NABA title
In 2015, he defeated Mike Gavronski to win the NABA title.  He successfully defended the title against Izaak Cardona, winning by split decision.

Other regional title attempts
Johnson lost to Jesse Hart for the North American Boxing Organization and United States Boxing Association super middleweight titles.

Other notable opponents
Johnson has competed against many notable opponents in non-title fights, but most ended in a loss.  He has lost to Peter Quillin, J'Leon Love, Sergio Mora, Dominic Wade, Joshua Clottey, Jermell Charlo, and Glen Tapia, while defeating Craig McEwan.

Sparring
Johnson has been a boxing sparring partner of Conor McGregor and Manny Pacquiao.

Mixed martial arts career
Johnson has also fought twice in the UFC, losing both bouts before his contract was cut by the organisation.

References

External links
 
 
 

1988 births
Living people
Super-middleweight boxers
American male boxers
American male mixed martial artists
Mixed martial artists utilizing boxing
Ultimate Fighting Championship male fighters